RNA-binding protein NOB1 is a protein that in humans is encoded by the NOB1 gene.

References

Further reading